Esteban "Stevie" Rodriguez Loera (born February 11, 1994) is an American professional soccer player.

Career

Club
Rodriguez signed with Club Tijuana upon turning 18 in 2012, with his youth club, Chivas USA, having been unable to reach a deal for him under Major League Soccer's Homegrown Player Rule.

He was loaned to Dorados, Tijuana's Ascenso MX affiliate, in 2014. He scored his first career first-team goal in August 2014.

Atlante
In December 2015, Club Tijuana send Rodriguez on loan to Atlante FC.

International
Rodriguez started four matches for the United States at the 2011 FIFA U-17 World Cup.

Honors
United States U17
CONCACAF U-17 Championship: 2011

References

External links

1994 births
Living people
American soccer players
American expatriate soccer players
Club Tijuana footballers
Dorados de Sinaloa footballers
Association football midfielders
Soccer players from Los Angeles
United States men's youth international soccer players